Micromoema xiphophora is a species of killifish from the family Rivulidae endemic to the Orinoco River basin in Venezuela where it is found in small pools in the forest. This species is the only known member of its genus.

References

Rivulidae
Monotypic fish genera
Fish described in 1992